Cedarbrook may refer to:
Cedarbrook, California
Cedarbrook, Pennsylvania
Cedarbrook, Philadelphia, Pennsylvania

See also
Cedar Brook (disambiguation)